Michael or Mike Watkins may refer to:

 Michael D. Watkins, American author
 Michael M. Watkins, American engineer and scientist
 Michael W. Watkins, American television producer
 Mike Watkins (rugby union) (born 1952), Welsh rugby union player
 Mike Watkins (basketball) (born 1995), American basketball player
 Mike Watkins (American football) (born 1978), American football player
 Mike K. Watkins (1947–1998), British explosive ordnance disposal expert commemorated at the Canadian National Vimy Memorial